The Air Creation GT and Clipper are a series of French two-seat flying wing ultralight trikes that was designed and produced by Air Creation.

Design and development
The GT series features a cable-braced hang glider-style high-wing, weight-shift controls, a tandem-seat, open cockpit, tricycle landing gear and a single engine in pusher configuration.

The aircraft is made from bolted-together aluminum tubing, with its double-surface wing covered in Trilam sailcloth. Its  area wing is supported by a single tube-type kingpost and uses an "A" frame control bar. A variety of wings and engines has been fitted to the GT carriage, to form new variants.

When equipped with a cockpit fairing, the aircraft is called the Clipper.

The GT series can be fitted with the later-designed Air Creation NuviX wing.

The GT was replaced in production by the Air Creation Skypper.

Variants
GT-BI
Version with XP-15 wing, center of gravity adjustable sliding keel, pneumatic suspension of all three landing gear wheels and a steerable nose wheel equipped with a drum brake. The engine is a Rotax 503 of 
Kiss 400 GTE 582
Kiss 450 GTE 582
Mild GTE 582 Float
XP-12 Buggy 582 SL
MILD-GTE 503 SL
MILD-GTE 582
XP-GTE 582 SL
Version with the XP wing and Rotax 582 engine of 
XP-Buggy
Version with the XP wing and Rotax 582 engine of 
iXess Clipper 582
XP-17 Clipper 912

Specifications (MILD-GTE 503 SL)

References

External links

1990s French ultralight aircraft
Single-engined pusher aircraft
Ultralight trikes
GT